Caerphilly is a constituency centred on the town of Caerphilly in South Wales, represented in the House of Commons of the UK Parliament since 2001 by Wayne David of the Labour Party.

Since its creation, the constituency has always elected Labour MPs, although the predecessor constituency of East Glamorganshire, and prior to that Glamorganshire had elected Liberal MPs throughout the Victorian era.

Boundaries

The Caerphilly constituency covers roughly the southern and eastern half of Caerphilly district, the part of the district historically located in Glamorgan. In the northwest of the constituency are communities such as Hengoed and Ystrad Mynach, extending in a southeasterly direction through Caerphilly and Llanbradach to the rural outcrops bordering Cardiff.

Members of Parliament

Elections

Elections in the 1910s

Elections in the 1920s

Elections in the 1930s

Elections in the 1940s

Elections in the 1950s

Elections in the 1960s

Elections in the 1970s

Elections in the 1980s

Elections in the 1990s

Elections in the 2000s

Elections in the 2010s

 

 

 

Of the 81 rejected ballots:
59 were either unmarked or it was uncertain who the vote was for.
22 voted for more than one candidate.

Of the 160 rejected ballots:
132 were either unmarked or it was uncertain who the vote was for.
28 voted for more than one candidate.

See also
 Caerphilly (Senedd constituency)
 List of parliamentary constituencies in Gwent
 List of parliamentary constituencies in Wales

Notes

References

External links
Politics Resources (Election results from 1922 onwards)
Electoral Calculus (Election results from 1955 onwards)
2017 Election House Of Commons Library 2017 Election report
A Vision Of Britain Through Time (Constituency elector numbers)

Parliamentary constituencies in South Wales
Constituencies of the Parliament of the United Kingdom established in 1918